A visionary is one who experiences a supernatural vision or apparition.

Visionary may also refer to:

Media 
 "Visionary" (Star Trek: Deep Space Nine), episode of the television series Star Trek: Deep Space Nine
 Visionary (Gordon Giltrap album), 1976
 Visionary (Eloy album), 2009
Visionary (Farruko album), 2015
 Visionary: The Video Singles, box set by Michael Jackson
 Visionary, the fifth studio album by Farruko
 Smasher (Image Comics), fictional comic book superhero originally known as Visionary

Business 
 Visionary Entertainment Studios Inc, American roleplaying games company
 Chief visionary officer, a function within a company

See also 
 Visionaries (disambiguation)